Minister for Women's Interests is a position in the government of Western Australia, currently held by Simone McGurk of the Labor Party. The position was first created after the 1983 state election, for the government of Brian Burke, and has existed in every government since then. Until 1992, the position was always held by the premier (male or female), who appointed an assistant minister to administer the portfolio. The women's interests portfolio falls within the state government's Department of Local Government and Communities.

Titles
 25 February 1983 – present: Minister for Women's Interests

List of ministers

List of assistant ministers

See also
 Minister for Planning (Western Australia)

References
 David Black (2014), The Western Australian Parliamentary Handbook (Twenty-Third Edition). Perth [W.A.]: Parliament of Western Australia.

Women
Minister for Women